Vida!... is the third album by the Canadian synthpop group Kon Kan, released in 1993 by Hypnotic Records (a subsidiary of A&M Records).

Two singles were released from the album: "Sinful Wishes" and "S.O.L.", the latter a collaboration with Crash Morgan (who died in 1995 after suffering a heart attack on stage whilst performing with the Canadian rock band Big Sugar).

"Moonage Daydream" was originally recorded by David Bowie, for his album The Rise and Fall of Ziggy Stardust and the Spiders from Mars.

"Move to Move (Revisited)" is an updated version of "Move to Move" from Kon Kan's first album, Move to Move.

"January Man" features the Coney Hatch guitarist Carl Dixon on mandolin.

Barry Harris and the drummer Anton Cook later reunited in the band Sick Seconds in 2011. They released their first album, Sick Seconds, in March 2013.

Track listing
"The Introdome" – 0:30 (Barry Harris)
"Sinful Wishes" – 4:20 (Barry Harris, Bob Mitchell)
"Mr. Fleming" – 4:43 (Barry Harris, Bob Mitchell)
"Should've Known Me (Better Than That)" – 3:15 (Barry Harris, Bob Mitchell)
"Moonage Daydream" – 5:38 (David Bowie)
"Move to Move (Revisited)" – 4:52 (Barry Harris, Bob Mitchell)
"January Man" – 4:46 (Barry Harris, Bob Mitchell)
"S.O.L" – 4:11 (Barry Harris, Bob Mitchell, Crash Morgan)
"Sinful Wishes" (Dance Mix) – 4:27 (Barry Harris, Bob Mitchell)
"In Silk" – 5:14 (Barry Harris)
"When Hope Is Gone" – 6:16 (Barry Harris)

Personnel
Barry Harris – lead vocals, keyboards, acoustic guitar, bass guitar
Anton Cook - drums
Mark Santers - drums (on "Sinful Wishes")
Michael Hampson - lead guitar, acoustic guitar
Seri Gee - keyboards, backing vocals, string arrangements
Lorrie Tice - vocals
Danny Leblanc - keyboards (on "S.O.L." and "January Man")
Carl Dixon - mandolin (on "January Man")

References

External links 

 Vida!... on Discogs

Kon Kan albums
1993 albums